Peter Maxwell Daniel FRCP FRCS FRCPath FRCPsych FLS FIBiol (14 November 1910 – 19 November 1998) was a British medical doctor, who specialised in neuropathology. He was president of the History of Medicine Society at The Royal Society of Medicine, London between 1979 and 1981.

Family 
Daniel's father was a senior surgeon at Charing Cross Hospital. He was married three times, first to Sally Shelford, then Dawn Bosanquet, followed by Marion Bosanquet who died in 1998. He had six children from the first two marriages.

Early life 
Educated at Westminster School, Cambridge, University of Oxford, Edinburgh, and Charing Cross Hospital Medical School, he completed medical training at the age of 30. He is known to have been expelled from his schools on two occasions.

Medical career 
Daniel had an early career in pathology at the Radcliffe Infirmary in Oxford. Here, he had the opportunity of working under Sir Hugh Cairns (surgeon) as a neuropathologist and perfected brain-cuts. His expertise lay in the diagnosis of Brain tumors diseases of the nervous system. Daniels presented his findings at regular postmortem demonstrations. He became president of various societies including the Neuropathological Society, the Osler Club, the Medical Society of London, the Harveian Society and the Physiological Society.

References 

1910 births
1998 deaths
British neurologists
Presidents of the History of Medicine Society